Binhe Boulevard is a major east–west expressway along the southern boundary of Shenzhen, Guangdong, China. It connects Binhai Boulevard in the west, crosses Futian and ends at Chuanbu Street, Luohu.

References

Roads in Shenzhen